Dean Zimmerman may refer to:
 Dean Zimmerman (philosopher)
 Dean Zimmerman (film editor)

See also
 Dean Zimmermann, American politician